Vineeth Kumar Velmurugan (born 31 December 2000), is an Indian professional footballer who plays as a winger for I-League club Sreenidi Deccan.

Club career

Chennai City
Born in Chennai, Tamil Nadu, Velmurugan represented his state's youth team before joining the youth side at Chennai City. After performing well for the under-18 side, Kumar was promoted to the first-team for the Durand Cup where he made two appearances.

Velmurugan made his professional debut for Chennai City in the I-League against Sudeva Delhi on 3 February 2021. He came on as an 83rd-minute substitute for the club in their 4–0 defeat. The next game, he scored his first professional goal against NEROCA. His 6th-minute goal was the first in a 2–1 victory. Kumar then scored a brace for Chennai City on 11 March 2021 against Indian Arrows. The two goals were part of a 5–0 victory.

Sreenidi Deccan
On 15 September 2021, Velmurugan signed for Sreenidi Deccan.

On 27 December 2021, he made his debut for the club against NEROCA, in a 3–2 loss, coming on as an 84th-minute substitute for Lalchungnunga. On 28 March 2022, he scored his first goal for the club, against Churchill Brothers, in a 1–1 stalemate.

Career statistics

Club

References

External links
 Profile at the All India Football Federation

2000 births
Living people
Footballers from Chennai
Indian footballers
Association football forwards
Chennai City FC players
I-League players
Sreenidi Deccan FC players